Homecoming is the fourteenth studio album by American country music artist Ed Bruce. It was released in 1985 via RCA Records. The includes the singles "You Turn Me On (Like a Radio)", "If It Ain't Love" and "When Giving Up Was Easy".

Track listing

Chart performance

References

1984 albums
Ed Bruce albums
RCA Records albums